M-phase phosphoprotein 6 is an enzyme that in humans is encoded by the MPHOSPH6 gene.

References

External links